Badung is a regency of Bali, Indonesia.  Its regency seat is in the upland town of Mangupura. It covers districts to the west of the provincial capital of Denpasar, and it has a land area of 418.52 km2.

The regency had a population of 548,191 at the 2020 Census. It has undergone a population boom in recent decades (although not between 2010 and 2020), and has grown into the largest of the suburban regions of Greater Denpasar. It covers Bali's most heavily populated tourist regions, including Kuta, Legian, Seminyak, Jimbaran, Nusa Dua, Canggu, Uluwatu, Badung, and Mengwi.  The northern part of the regency is relatively unpopulated, but the part near the coast and west of Denpasar from Jimbaran and up to Canggu is heavily populated. Ngurah Rai International Airport is located within the Regency.

Administrative districts

The Regency is divided into six districts (kecamatan), listed below from south to north with their areas and their populations at the 2010 Census and the 2020 Census. It is further subdivided into villages.

Demographics
Badung Regency is home to many people from outside Bali who came for work.  Therefore, its ethnic makeup is more cosmopolitan than rural Bali, although some parts of the regency itself are still agricultural and rural.
It has an area of 418.52 km2 with a population of 548,191 (at the 2020 Census), giving a density of 1,309.8 per square kilometre.

Breeding Center
On 8 November 2011 a breeding center for the endangered Bali starling was officially inaugurated in Sibang, Badung Regency inside the Green School area with initial 73 starlings. 20 of the birds came from various zoos in Europe, another 3 came from Jurong Bird Park in Singapore, and the others were already at the breeding center. If the breeding program gets success, some of them will be released into the wild, 4 of the breeding stock to Koelner Zoo and 3 to Jurong Bird Park. There were currently about 500 birds throughout Bali, 287 of them in breeding centers.

References

External links 
 
 
  
 Map of Badung Regency